Richard Welstead Croker (November 24, 1843 – April 29, 1922), known as "Boss Croker", was an Irish American political boss who was a leader of New York City's Tammany Hall. His control over the city was cemented with the 1897 election of Robert A. Van Wyck as the first Mayor of all five boroughs. During his tenure as Grand Sachem, Boss Croker garnered a reputation for corruption and ruthlessness and was frequently the subject of investigations. As his power waned following the 1900 and 1901 elections, Croker resigned his position and returned to Ireland, where he spent the rest of his life.

Biography

Richard Croker was born in the townland of Ballyva, in the parish of Ardfield, six miles south of Clonakilty in County Cork on November 24, 1843, son of Eyre Coote Croker (1800–1881) and Frances Laura Welsted (1807–1894). He was taken to the United States by his parents when he was just two years old. They boarded the Henry Clay in Cobh, County Cork and headed for the land of opportunity.

There were significant differences between this family and the typical family leaving Ireland at that time. They were Protestant, and were not land tenants. Eyre Coote Croker owned an estate in Ardfield, in southwest Cork. Upon arrival in the United States, Eyre Coote Croker was without a profession, but he had a general knowledge of horses and soon became a veterinary surgeon. During the Civil War, he served in that same capacity under General Daniel Sickles.

Richard Croker was educated in New York public schools. Croker dropped out of school at age twelve or thirteen to become an apprentice machinist in the Harlem Railroad machine shops. Not long after, he became a valued member of the Fourth Avenue Tunnel Gang, a street gang that attacked teamsters and other workers that gathered around the Harlem line's freight depot. Croker eventually became the gang's leader. He joined one of the Volunteer Fire Departments in 1863, becoming an engineer of one of the engine companies. That was his gateway into public life. James O'Brien, a Tammany associate, took notice of Croker after Croker won a boxing match against Dick Lynch whereby Crocker knocked out all of Lynch's teeth. Croker became a member of Tammany Hall and active in its politics. In the 1860s he was well known for being a "repeater" at elections, voting multiple times at the polls. He was an alderman from 1868–70, Coroner of New York County, New York from 1873–76. Croker was charged with the murder of John McKenna, a lieutenant of James O'Brien, during a fight on election day of 1874 with O'Brien's rival political group. O'Brien was running for Congress against the Tammany-backed Abram S. Hewitt. John Kelly, the new Tammany Hall boss, attended the trial and Croker was freed after the jury was undecided. Croker moved to Harrison, New York by 1880. He was appointed the New York City Fire Commissioner in 1883 and 1887 and city Chamberlain from 1889-90.

After the death of John Kelly, Croker became the leader of Tammany Hall, and for some time almost completely controlled that organization. As head of Tammany, Croker received bribe money from the owners of brothels, saloons and illegal gambling dens. Croker was chairman of Tammany's Finance Committee but received no salary for his position. Croker also became a partner in the real estate firm Meyer and Croker with Peter F. Meyer, from which he made substantial money. This money was often derived from sales under the control of the city through city judges. Other income came by way of gifts of stock from street railway and transit companies, for example. The city police were largely still under the control of Tammany Hall, and payoffs from vice protection operations also contributed to Tammany income. Croker survived Charles Henry Parkhurst's attacks on Tammany Hall's corruption and became a wealthy man. Several committees were established in the 1890s, largely at the behest of Thomas C. Platt and other Republicans, to investigate Tammany and Croker, including the 1890 Fassett Committee, the 1894 Lexow Committee, during which Croker left the United States for his European residences for three years, and the Mazet Investigation of 1899.

Croker's greatest political success was his bringing about the 1897 election of Robert A. Van Wyck as first mayor of the five-borough "greater" New York, and during Van Wyck's administration Croker is popularly supposed to have completely dominated the government of the city.

Croker was in the newspapers in 1899 after a disagreement with Jay Gould's son, George Gould, president of the Manhattan Elevated Railroad Company, when Gould refused Croker's attempt to attach compressed-air pipes to the Elevated company's structures. Croker owned many shares of the New York Auto-Truck Company, a company which would have benefited from the arrangement. In response to the refusal, Croker used Tammany influence to create new city laws requiring drip pans under structures in Manhattan at every street crossing and the requirement that the railroad run trains every five minutes with a $100 violation for every instance. Croker also held 2,500 shares of the American Ice Company, worth approximately $250,000, which came under scrutiny in 1900 when the company attempted to raise the price of ice in the city.

After Croker's failure to carry the city in the presidential election of 1900 and the defeat of his mayoralty candidate, Edward M. Shepard in 1901, he resigned from his position of leadership in Tammany and was succeeded by Lewis Nixon. He departed the United States in 1905. An associate described Croker as having "[a] strong frame, a deep chest, a short neck and a pair of hard fists... He speaks in monosyllables, [and] commands a vocabulary that appears to be limited to about three hundred words..."

Thoroughbred racing

Croker operated a stable of thoroughbred racehorses in the United States in partnership with Mike Dwyer. In January 1895, they sent a stable of horses to England under the care of trainer Hardy Campbell, Jr. and jockey Willie Simms. Following a dispute, the partnership was dissolved in May but Croker continued to race in England.

In 1907, his horse Orby won Britain's most prestigious race, The Derby. Orby was ridden by American jockey John Reiff, whose brother Lester had won the race in 1901. Croker was also the breeder of Orby's son Grand Parade, who won the Derby in 1919.

Death
Croker returned to Ireland in 1905 and died on April 29, 1922, at Glencairn House, his home in Stillorgan outside Dublin. 
His funeral, celebrated by South African bishop William Miller, drew some of Dublin's most eminent citizens; the pallbearers were Arthur Griffith, the President of Dáil Éireann; Laurence O'Neill, the Lord Mayor of Dublin; Oliver St. John Gogarty; Joseph MacDonagh; A.H. Flauley, of Chicago; and J.E. Tierney. Michael Collins, Chairman of the Provisional Government, was represented by Kevin O'Shiel; the Lord Lieutenant, Viscount FitzAlan, was represented by his under-secretary, James MacMahon.

In 1927, J. J. Walsh claimed that, just before his death, Croker had accepted the Provisional Government's invitation to stand in Dublin County in the imminent Irish election.

Family
Croker married twice; first, in 1873, to Elizabeth Fraser (b. abt. 1853 in New York, d. 6 September 1914 in Berne, Switzerland). They had several children, including:
Richard Samuel Croker "Jr." (30 March 1877 in New York – aft. 1940), attended Brown University and married 12 March 1898 to Mary Brophy, without issue.
Francis H. "Frank" Croker (15 Sep 1878 in Fordham, Bronx County, New York – 22 Jan 1905 in Ormond Beach, Florida). His monumental grave was erected by his father following his death from injuries sustained in avoiding a motorcyclist while automobile racing. No issue.
Joseph Croker (January 1880 in New York – bef. 1890)
Herbert Vincent "Bertie" Croker (abt. 1882 USA – 12 May 1905)
Florence Genevieve Croker (b. 7 October 1884 in Manhattan, New York), married at least two times.
Howard F. Croker (b. 5 May 1886 in New York City, New York – January 1979), married 1 May 1915 on Long Island to Gertrude White (b. 19 Oct 1893, Cedarhurst, Long Island, New York)
Ethel J. Croker (b. 16 July 1888 in New York City, New York), married Thomas Francis White (b. 19 December 1882).

He married Beulah Benson Edmondson (1884–1957) in November 1914 when he was 71 years old. She was of American Indian descent, her tribal name being Ketaw Kaluntuchy.

Disputed will
Croker left an estate estimated to $3–5 million to his second wife, Beulah, disinheriting his estranged children. He had converted to Catholicism shortly before his death but this does not appear to have played a role in his disinheriting his children. A note in his handwriting, dated at Glencairn, November 15, 1919 read as follows:

Croker's other surviving children, Richard, Ethel, and Howard, unsuccessfully challenged the will in a celebrated probate lawsuit in the Court of King's Bench in Ireland. They claimed that their father in 1919 was of unsound mind and unduly influenced by his wife, and that the 1914 marriage was void as she was already married to one Guy R. Marone. A jury rejected all these allegations. The widow and children had related lawsuits in the United States.

References

Further reading

External links

1843 births
1922 deaths
19th-century Irish people
20th-century Irish people
People from County Cork
Leaders of Tammany Hall
American racehorse owners and breeders
Owners of Epsom Derby winners
Converts to Roman Catholicism
Irish emigrants to the United States (before 1923)
American political bosses from New York (state)
American gangsters of Irish descent
New York (state) Democrats
Coroners of New York County, New York